is a Japanese intellectual and professor emeritus of literature at the University of Electro-Communications in Tokyo, Japan.

He was awarded a degree in German literature and a PhD in literature from the University of Tokyo. He has translated the works of Friedrich Nietzsche and Arthur Schopenhauer into Japanese and has written over seventy published works and over thirty translations.

Nishio, regarded as a rightist intellectual, was the head of the Japanese Society for History Textbook Reform (新しい歴史教科書を作る会, Atarashii Rekishi Kyokasho wo Tsukuru Kai). This was founded in January 1997 by right-wing scholars and cartoonists to devise a new Japanese history textbook because they considered existing ones to be "self-torturing". Nishio has a wide following in Japan.

He opposes immigration into Japan because he believes it would cause social disorganisation and threaten social cohesion; the subtitle of one of his works is "foreign workers will destroy Japan". Nishio claimed "This is not necessarily an economic problem. Frankly speaking, it is a problem of ‘cultural defense’".

Notes

1935 births
Living people
Japanese literature academics
University of Tokyo alumni
Historical negationism